The "Imphal Polo Ground", originally known as "Mapal Kangjeibung", is the world's oldest polo ground, in Imphal, the metropolis of Manipur.. It has its earliest recorded history of existence right from the 15th century BC (3500 years back).

Related pages 

 Hapta Kangjeibung
 Manung Kangjeibung

References 

Polo
Imphal
Pages with unreviewed translations